Ian Michael Nelson (born 1994/95) is an American actor. He played the teen version of werewolf Derek Hale in the television series Teen Wolf, Eric Palmer in the drama film The Judge, and Andy in the Hulu series There's...Johnny!.

Personal life
Nelson is the son of Mark and Janie Nelson, and the youngest of four children. Nelson attended Forsyth Country Day School in Lewisville, North Carolina. He studied screenwriting at the University of Southern California. Nelson is Jewish.

Career
Nelson first became interested in the performing arts by auditioning for a school musical to impress a girl. He performed in several local shows, including Piedmont Opera's Amahl and the Night Visitors. In addition to acting and singing, he is a dancer, and featured in the Macy's Thanksgiving Day Parade on three occasions. To further hone his craft, Nelson studied at the University of North Carolina School of the Arts and the Stagedoor Manor performing arts school. He also trained under Burgess Jenkins at Jenkins' Actors Group school.

His first film role was a non-speaking part as the unnamed tribute from District 3 in The Hunger Games in 2012. That was followed by Alone yet Not Alone the following year. The movie, filmed in Virginia and Tennessee, was filmed prior to The Hunger Games. Throughout 2013 and 2014, Nelson appeared in Medeas, The Judge, and The Best of Me. In 2015, he starred in The Boy Next Door as Kevin, the son of Jennifer Lopez and John Corbett. Nelson described the experience as a "great role", stating he really enjoyed the collaboration with director Rob Cohen.

Nelson's first foray into television was in the role of a teen were-wolf Derek Hale in Teen Wolf. He appeared as the teenaged version of Tyler Hoechlin's character in three episodes throughout the third and fourth seasons. He went on to appear in Criminal Minds and Comedy Bang! Bang!, before earning a recurring role as Parker in The Deleted, which aired in 2016. Nelson stars as Andy on There's...Johnny!, a show depicting the backstage workings of The Tonight Show during Johnny Carson's tenure in the 1970s. The series was released on Hulu in November 2017. He is starring in the upcoming drama film Paper Spiders opposite Stefania LaVie Owen and Lili Taylor.

Filmography

Film

Television

Theater
 Amahl and the Night Visitors – Amahl
 13 – Archie Walker
 West Side Story – Baby John
 Oliver! – Artful Dodger
 The Secret Garden – Colin Craven
 You're a Good Man Charlie Brown – Linus van Pelt
 Joseph and the Amazing Technicolor Dreamcoat – Joseph

References

External links
 

1995 births
Living people
Male actors from North Carolina
American male film actors
American male television actors
21st-century American male actors
Jewish American male actors
University of Southern California alumni
21st-century American Jews